Jennifer Mary Nicks (13 April 1932 – 21 August 1980) was a British pair skater. She competed with brother John Nicks. In 1953, the two won Great Britain's only World and European titles in pair skating, after having placed fourth at the 1952 Winter Olympics.

Personal life 
Jennifer Nicks, the daughter of a sporting goods store owner, grew up in Brighton, England. She was the sister of John Nicks. She died in 1980 as the result of a heart attack.

Career 
Jennifer Nicks began skating after her father – who knew nothing about skating but wanted to sell skating equipment – put her and her brother in skates in order to learn more about them.

Jennifer and John Nicks competed initially as singles skaters but agreed to train together in pair skating upon the request of the British association, which promised to support them. They made their first Olympic appearance at the 1948 Winter Olympics, where they finished 8th. The pair won the first of their four World medals, silver, at the 1950 World Championships. They won World bronze the next two seasons and competed at their second Olympics in 1952, where they finished 4th. The pair won gold at the 1953 World Championships in Davos, Switzerland. They retired from competition after the event.

Competitive highlights 
(with John Nicks)

References

External links
 Pairs on Ice profile
 John and Jennifer Nicks

1932 births
1980 deaths
Sportspeople from Brighton
British female pair skaters
Olympic figure skaters of Great Britain
Figure skaters at the 1952 Winter Olympics
Figure skaters at the 1948 Winter Olympics
World Figure Skating Championships medalists
European Figure Skating Championships medalists